Voices of Dust is the second studio album by Demdike Stare, released on November 29, 2010 by Modern Love Records.

Track listing

Personnel
Adapted from the Voices of Dust liner notes.

Demdike Stare
 Sean Canty – producer
 Miles Whittaker – producer

Production and additional personnel
 Andreas Lubich – mastering
 Radu Prepeleac – design
 Andy Votel – cover art

Release history

References

External links 
 

2010 albums
Demdike Stare albums
Modern Love Records albums
Instrumental albums